Mount Riiser-Larsen is a prominent mountain, 870 m, standing at the northwest end of the Tula Mountains on the east side of Amundsen Bay. It was named by the British Australian New Zealand Antarctic Research Expedition (BANZARE) under Mawson in January 1930 for Captain Hjalmar Riiser-Larsen, the leader of a Norwegian expedition in the Norvegia which also explored the area in that season.

Further reading 
 United States. Defense Mapping Agency. Hydrographic Center, Sailing Directions for Antarctica: Includes Islands South of Latitude 60.̊, P 248
 Itoyuki Nishioka, Naoto Ishikawa, and Minoru Funaki, Magnetic fabric analysis of deformed rocks in the Riiser-Larsen Main Shear Zone, East Antarctica, Polar Geosci., 18, 1525, 2005
 National Science Foundation, Antarctic Journal of the United States, Volumes 14-15, P 47

External links 

 Mount Riiser-Larsen on USGS website
 Mount Riiser-Larsen on AADC website
 Mount Riiser-Larsen on SCAR website

References 

Mountains of Enderby Land